Jens Schuermans (born 13 February 1993) is a Belgian mountain bike racer. He rode in the cross-country event at the 2016 Summer Olympics.

Major results

MTB
2015
 3rd  Cross-country, European Under-23 Championships
2017
 1st  Cross-country, National Championships
2018
 1st  Cross-country, National Championships
2019
 1st  Cross-country, National Championships
2020
 1st  Cross-country, National Championships
2021
 1st  Cross-country, National Championships
2022
 1st  Cross-country, National Championships

Road
2012
 1st Stage 4 Tour de Namur
2022
 4th Overal Flèche du Sud
 6th Rutland–Melton CiCLE Classic

References

External links
 

1993 births
Living people
Belgian male cyclists
Olympic cyclists of Belgium
Cyclists at the 2016 Summer Olympics
Cyclists at the 2020 Summer Olympics
Sportspeople from Genk
Cyclists from Limburg (Belgium)